The 2007 All-Ireland Senior Hurling Championship was the 121st staging of the All-Ireland hurling championship since its establishment by the Gaelic Athletic Association in 1887. The championship began on 22 May 2007 and ended on 2 September 2007.

Kilkenny were the defending champions, and successfully retained their All-Ireland crown following a 2–19 to 1–15 defeat of Limerick. This put them on level terms with Cork on 30 titles.

Teams

A total of twelve teams contested the championship, including eleven teams from the 2006 championship and new entrant. Westmeath were relegated in 2006 and contested the 2007 Christy Ring Cup, while Antrim, winners of the 2006 Christy Ring Cup, gained automatic promotion back to hurling's top tier.

Team summaries

Personnel and kits

Leinster Senior Hurling Championship

Quarter-final

Semi-finals

Final

Munster Senior Hurling Championship

Quarter-final

Semi-finals

Final

All-Ireland Qualifiers

Group 1A

Group 1B

All-Ireland Senior Hurling Championship

Quarter-finals

Semi-finals

Final

Championship statistics

Miscellaneous

 For the first time since 1998, neither Cork nor Tipperary reached the Munster final.
 The Munster final meeting of Limerick and Waterford is their first meeting in a provincial decider since 1934.
 Limerick qualify for the All-Ireland final for the first time since 1996. It is also their first meeting with Kilkenny in a championship decider since 1974
 In winning the All-Ireland title, Kilkenny claim their 30th championship and draw level with Cork at the top of the all-time roll of honour.

Top scorers

Championship

Single game

References

All-Ireland Senior Hurling Championships